Federal elections were held in Germany on 15 June 1893. Despite the Social Democratic Party (SPD) receiving a plurality of votes, the Centre Party remained the largest party in the Reichstag after winning 96 of the 397 seats, whilst the SPD won just 44. Voter turnout was 72.4%.

Results

Alsace-Lorraine

References

Federal elections in Germany
Germany
1893 elections in Germany
Elections in the German Empire
June 1893 events